The Exiles trilogy is a fantasy novel series originally planned as a trilogy, written by American author Melanie Rawn. The series consists of two published booksThe Ruins of Ambrai (1994) and The Mageborn Traitor (1997)and the unwritten final novel The Captal's Tower.

Exiles is set in Lenfell, a world with a matriarchal based society. The rebellion known as the Rising is expanding to combat the unjust Tier system and treatment of men and Mageborns. There are predominantly three facets of power vying for control, each represented by a daughter of the House of Ambrai. Glenin, the oldest, represents the Lords of Malerris, Mageborn following the Weaver. Sarra, the second daughter, represents politics as First Daughter of Blooded adoptive family. Cailet, the youngest, represents the once-powerful and thought to be extinct, Mage Guardians.

Mageborn
A Mageborn is a person born with magical aptitude. A Mageborn must learn to control their magic or have it warded; otherwise, it could become wild.

There are two warring factions of Mageborn, the Mage Guardians and the Lords of Malerris. The war between these factions escalated greatly until it nearly destroyed all of Lenfell in the Waste Wars. This battle released Wild Magic and created the Waste. After the war, most people distrusted and became hostile towards Mageborn. As a result, many Mageborn were hunted and killed until they were thought to be extinct.

Mage Guardians
The Mage Guardians had been the protectors of the people of Lenfell, but after the Waste Wars many were killed and the few survivors had to go into hiding.

Most Mages follow the Captal, who has the knowledge of all previous Captals. There are three different specializations of Mage Guardians: Warrior Mage, Healer Mage, and Scholar Mage. The Warrior Mages use magic and swords in combat. They are led by the First Sword, second in command to the Mage Captal. Healer Mages are trained to use magic and wards to heal wounds, both physical and mental. They usually excel in defensive warding as opposed to offensive. Mage Guardians do not need a specialization, but they make-up the majority of all Mages. Mageborn who are still in training are referred to as Prentice Mages.

Lords of Malerris
The Lords of Malerris believe that their patron saint, the Weaver, has a plan for Lenfell woven into the Great Loom. The First Lord rules the Lords in the hidden Malerris Castle. They guide the others in weaving/revealing the Weaver's tapestry. The Fifth Lord acts as the scissors, cutting the strings no longer need or knotting the weaving. The strings are usually people's lives. A woman cannot become a lady of Malerris until she has born a child.

The order of command for the Lords of Malerris goes as such

             Warden of the Loom- First Lord
                    |
 Master Weaver- Second Lord, Threadkeeper- Third Lord, Master Spinner- Fourth Lord, Seneschal- Fifth Lord
                    |
         Lords and Ladies of Malerris
                    |
             Lower Malerris

Characters
 Cailet Ambrai
 Youngest daughter of Maichen Ambrai and Auvry Feiran, she is born after the fall of Ambrai and in secret. She is raised by Lilen Ostin in the Waste and is later trained by Gorynel Desse to be a Mage Guardian.
 Glenin Ambrai
 First Daughter of Maichen Ambrai and Auvry Feiran, she is taken by her father, Auvry Feiran, after he betrays Ambrai to the Lords of Malerris. Her Name was changed to Feiran in 951. He raises her at Ryka Court under the tutelage of First Councillor Anniyas. 
 Sarra Ambrai
 Second daughter of Maichen Ambrai and Auvry Feiran, she is rescued from the destruction of Ambrai by First Sword Gorynel Desse, who wards her identity as an Ambrai with magic. He brings her to Agatine Slegin and Orlin Renne, who raise Sarra as their adopted First Daughter.
 Avira Anniyas
 First Councillor and First Lord of Malerris, she presides of the Senate and secretly the Lords of Malerris. She has Glenin marry her only son in order to produce a powerful Mageborn grandson.
 Gorynel Desse
 First Sword, he rescues Sarra and her pregnant mother from the ruins of Ambrai and hides their identities, along with Cailet's. He is responsible for warding Collan's memories and for training Cailet as a Mage.
 Jored Karellos
 An orphan Mageborn, he appears at Mage Hall and develops a relationship with Taigan.
 Mikel Liwellan
 Sarra's Mageborn son and Taigan's twin
 Taigan Liwellan
 Sarra's Mageborn First Daughter and Mikel's twin
 Josselin Mikleine
 An orphan, he is rescued by Collan from essential slavery. He has a talent for making things grow and is Mageborn.
 Collan Rosvenir
 His true identity is warded, along with many memories; however, he remembers being a slave and being trained by the famous bard, Falundir. He is a minstrel and is married to Sarra Ambrai.

Lenfell
Lenfell is the fictional world portrayed in the series.  The capital is Ryka Court, and the land is divided into Shirs.  It is a federal system governed by the Council, which seats a representative from every Shir, and is led by the First Councillor.

One of the defining events in Lenfell's history was the Waste Wars, in which two factions of magic, the Malerissi and the Mage Guardians, fought and set loose cataclysmic magic. The resulting outburst of magic let loose upon the world caused many deaths and birth defects that lasted for generations. Because of the war, women of particular bloodlines rule Lenfell, due to the difficulty in giving birth and the need to repopulate. The Bloods and Tiers, a forced class system, were also created due to the war.

The Malerissi and the Mage Guardians continue to be antagonistic.

Lenfell is a corruption of the term "Land-fall" used by the early, Catholic refugee settlers of the world.

Bloods and Tiers
Bloods
The Bloods are in essence the ruling class of Lenfell.  During the defining First Census, a family with the fewest birth defects was granted Blood Status. As with all families, Bloods have two colours for their Name, but they are also given a gold Sigil to mark their status.
Tiers
Originally there were five tiers, Firsts and Seconds being the highest next to Bloods. The Thirds and Fourths are in the lower echelon of Lenfell's society. Over time, the Fifth Tier - the one with the most genetic anomalies – died out. First and Second Tier Names also have sigils, Silver for Firsts, and Copper for Seconds.

As the importance of women increased, men lost prominence and all power in the aftermath of the Waste Wars. After a time, men became akin to slaves in society's eyes. A Tierless woman is considered above a man. First Daughters can marry their male family members off for political and business gains. A man is supposed to lower his eyes for women and always wear coifs in public to cover their hair. The prestige, power, and political influence a woman can have is often based on her Tier. A man of a higher Tier will be sought after for a consort to enrich or preserve a bloodline.

The Tier system was seemingly abolished upon the marriage of the Lady Glenin Feiran (née Ambrai) to Garon Anniyas. Although officially there are no more Bloods or Tiers, the people of Lenfell have long memories of their status and that of others.

Government
The First Councillor presides over the Council of Lenfell in the capital, Ryka Court. Each Shir is represented by a Senior and Junior Councillor. Councillors are women or men, usually a Blood.

Each Shir is ruled by the First Daughter of the ruling Blood family. Some Shirs have ruling families with titles from before the Waste Wars, such as the Grand Duchess of Domburronshir.

Cities and towns (Shirs)
Several notable cities dot Lenfell's landscape.  There is the capital, Ryka Court, where the Council meets.

Ambrai, capital of Ambraishir and former center of culture and Mage Guardians, was destroyed by Auvry Feiran and the Council Guard  but is being rebuilt.

Other cities are known for various things, including beautiful Saints murals, gardens, and ironworks, among other things.

 Ryka Court (Ryka)
 Havenport (Shellinkroth)
 Shainkroth (Tillinshir)
 Longriding (The  Waste)
 Combel (The  Waste)
 Renig (The  Waste)
 Ambrai (Ambraishir)
 Roseguard (Sheve)
 Pinderon (Cantrashir)
 Cantratown (Cantrashir)
 Wyte Lynn Castle (Bleynbradden)
 Neele (Bogdenguard)
 Kenroke (Kenrokeshir)
 Roke Castle (Kenrokeshir)
 Domburr Castle (Domburronshir)
 Domburron (Domburronshir)
 Firrense (Gierkenshir)
 Dinn (Dindenshire)
 Isodir (Rinesteenshir)

The Rising
The Rising is the rebellion formed in large part by the Ostins. The Rising opposes the growing power of the First Councillor, the Tier system, and the unfair treatment of men. The introduction of mandatory identity disks greatly strengthens the ranks of the rebellion. The disks stated the name and Tier of its owner and were required to be worn at all times.

The Rising uses a matrix of communications created by Sarra Liwellan to keep members safe from traitors. A similar system comprising minstrels is organized by Collan Rosvenir to gather information.

Religion
The peoples of Lenfell believe in a Calendar of Saints. Each Saint has a dedicated week in the thirty-six-week calendar. There is also Wraithenday, which commemorates the fallen of the past. Given names are almost always variations of a Saint's name (their Name Saint) and each person has a Birth Saint for the Week of their birth. Each Saint is a patron of various abilities or characteristics. A person is free the follow and/or pray to whichever Saint they choose, the exception being the Lords of Malerris, who only follow the Weaver.

The Captal's Tower 
The Captal's Tower is the unreleased planned third novel in the Exiles trilogy. Personal issues prevented Rawn from finishing it when originally planned in the late 1990s. In 2014, she said she would complete the book after the fifth book in the Glass Thorns series.

References 

Fantasy novel trilogies